Bunown is a civil parish in County Westmeath, Ireland.

Bunown is one of 4 civil parishes in the barony of Kilkenny West in the Province of Leinster.

Bunown civil parish comprises 18 townlands: Ballinlough, Bunown, Garnagh Island, Glassan, Glebe, Hareisland, Inchmore, Inchmore (Tiernan), Killeenmore, Killinure North, Killinure South, Lissakillen North, Lissakillen South, Nuns Island, Portlick, Rooan, Skeanaveane and Whinning.

The neighbouring civil parish is: Kilkenny West to the east.

References

External links
Bunown civil parish at the IreAtlas Townland Data Base
Bunown civil parish at townlands.ie
Bunown civil parish at The Placenames Database of Ireland

Civil parishes of County Westmeath